The Avro 510 was a two-seat racing seaplane designed by Avro to compete in the 1914 Circuit of Britain Race. It was a conventional two-bay biplane of greatly uneven span, equipped with two large central floats and two outriggers. The race was called off at the outbreak of the First World War, but the British Admiralty was aware of the type and ordered five examples, with modified floats and tail. In service, these proved completely unsuitable, and it was discovered that with a second person aboard, the aircraft could barely fly. In October 1915, the 510s in service were sent to Supermarine for modification and improvement, but by March the following year all were removed from service.

Specifications

See also

Notes
Most sources give the powerplant of the 510 as a Sunbeam Nubian, an engine that would not yet exist until all the 510s had been withdrawn from service in 1916. The Wolverhampton Museum of Industry website  cites Eric Brew's Sunbeam Aero Engines and identifies the 510's engine as a Crusader.

References

Further reading

 

1910s British sport aircraft
Floatplanes
510
Racing aircraft
Sesquiplanes
Single-engined tractor aircraft
Aircraft first flown in 1914
Biplanes